AZN Television (formerly called International Channel) was a cable TV channel which promoted itself as "the network for Asian America". It was run by International Networks, a wholly owned subsidiary of Comcast Corporation. The channel's programming targeted the fast-growing, young, affluent, English-speaking Asian-American community.  Genres included the most popular Asian films, dramas, documentaries and music as well as a diverse slate of original programming. It competed in certain markets with ImaginAsian Television.

History

The channel was launched as the International Channel in 1990, and was initially owned by a joint venture of Liberty Media (which had a 90% stake) and JJS II Communications, LLC (which had the remaining 10% stake). In 1996, the two companies founded the International Cable Channels Partnership, Ltd., which oversaw the channel. The channel was sold to Comcast when it purchased its parent company, International Networks (now International Media Distribution) in July 2004.
In March 2005, Comcast rebranded and refocused the International Channel to AZN Television, which now focused purely on Asian and Asian-American culture.
In late 2005, news of mass layoffs at the network prompted fears that Comcast would shut down AZN. However, the network remained on the air and continued to sponsor the annual Asian Excellence Awards, which highlights Asian American achievement in film and television. In January 2008, Comcast announced it would be shutting down AZN and moving the Asian Excellence Awards show to E! The channel went off the air on April 9, 2008, at noon. The network was shut down as foreign language tiers with international networks, which have their own charges and feature content on networks International Channel struggled to balance onto a 168-hour weekly schedule, became much more popular, cost-effective, and had better quality controls, and more importantly, had programming originated on their own domestic networks.

Programming

Dramas and sitcoms

Abarenbou Mama (Japanese drama)
ABC DJ (Singaporean comedy)
 Akash (Hindi drama)
 Alejandra (Portuguese drama)
 Babul Ki Duayein Leti Ja (Hindi drama)
 Best Theater (Korean drama)
 Bonds of Blood (Cantonese drama)
Book and Sword, Gratitude and Revenge (Chinese drama)
 Chandan Ka Paina Resham Ki Dori (Hindi drama)
 Chattan (Hindi drama)
Coffee Prince (Korean drama)
Dae Jo Young (Korean drama)
 The Daughter of a Thief (Korean drama)
Dead Men Do Tell Tales (Chinese drama)
 The Dragon's Pearl (Thai drama)
 Dreams of Red Mansions (Mandarin drama)
 Emperor Kang Xi (Mandarin drama)
 Esperanza (Tagalog drama) 
 Flames (Tagalog drama)
 Food, Glorious Food (Vietnamese drama)
 Full House (Korean drama)
 Good Morning General (Cantonese drama)
 Happy Flying Dragon (Cantonese drama)
 Happy Flying Dragon III (Cantonese drama)
 Here Comes the God of Wealth (Cambodian drama)
High Kick (Korean sitcom)
 Hong Gil Dong (Korean drama)
Hotelier (Korean drama)
Hwang Jin Yi (Korean drama)
Iryu 2 (Japanese drama)
It started with a kiss (Taiwanese drama)
Ivy Dreams (reality)
Jewel in the Palace (Korean historical drama)
 Joyful Family (Vietnamese drama)
King of Hades (Chinese folklore drama)
Krystala (Filipino Fantasy/Adventure)
 Last Emperor (Mandarin drama)
 The Legend of Ne Zha (Cambodian drama)
 Legend of Yung Ching II (Cantonese drama)
Living with Lydia (Singaporean sitcom)
 Love Revolution (Japanese drama) 
Love Truly
 Mangang (Korean drama)
MARS (Taiwanese drama)
My Lovely Samsoon (Korean drama)
 The Name of Love (Korean drama)
 One Gloomy Day (Korean drama)
 OP-7 (Swedish drama)
 Pangako Sa 'Yo (Tagalog drama)
 Popcorn (Korean drama)
Popcorn Zen (short films)
 Power of Love (Japanese drama)
 Return of the Condor Heroes (Vietnamese drama)
 Riding the Storm (Cambodian drama)
 Righteous Guards II (Cantonese drama)
 Romantic Express (Mandarin drama)
Rooftop Room Cat (a.k.a. Attic Cat) (Korean drama)
Saara Akaash (Hindi drama)
The Seven Swordsmen (Chinese drama)
Legend of Heaven & Earth (Taiwanese/Vietnamese Fantasy Drama) 
Someday (Korean drama)
 The Song of Wind (Korean drama)
Stories of the Han Dynasty (Chinese drama)
 The Story of Duk-Yi (Korean drama)
 Sun Wu (Vietnamese drama)
 Sweet Bride (Korean drama)
 Little Fish (Chinese Fantasy Drama) 
 Thank You (Korean drama)
 A Wednesday Love Affair (Japanese drama)
 The Wedding Planner (Japanese drama)
 Young Master of Shaolin (Vietnamese drama)

News

  Al Jazeera Headline News (Arabic news)
 American Muslim Hour (Israeli other/English news)
 Antenna Satellite News (Greek news)
Balitang America with Cara Subijano (Filipino-American Newscast)
 China News from Beijing (Mandarin news)
 Deutsche Welle News (German news)
Fujisankei News (Japanese news)
 Global Report News (Vietnamese news)
 Hodo 2001 / Hodo 2002 (Japanese news)
 Insight (German news)
 International Report News (Cantonese news)
 Journal de France 2 (French news)
 LBC News (Arabic news)
 News Desk From Seoul (Korean news)
 NHK News (Japanese news)
 Oriental Horizons (Mandarin news)
 Pardres (Hindi news)
 Philippines Tonight (Tagalog news)
 Polsat News (Informacje, Polish news)
 Power News (Mandarin news)
 Romanian Voice (Romanian news)
 Russian News from Moscow: Vremya (Russian news)
 Russian News: NTV America (Russian news)
 Télématin (French news)
 Telegiornale (Italian news)
 TV Asia News (Hindi news)
 TV4 Daily (Dziennik TV4, Polish news)
 U.N. World Chronicle (English news)
 The Week in Review (Central America) (Spanish news)
 World Report (Mandarin news)

Variety/music

Asap (1999-2002) Variety Music show Philippines 
 Amanat (Hindi variety/music)
 Antakshri (Hindi variety/music)
 Arabic Variety (Arabic variety/music)
 Asian Variety Show (Hindi variety/music)
 Canape (French variety/music)
 Chinese Top 20 (Mandarin variety/music)
 Cinema AZN (30 minutes, weekly)
 Culture Club (Korean variety/music)
 French Feelings (French variety/music) 
Hey! Hey! Hey! Music Champ (Japanese variety/music) 
 Hindi Variety (Hindi variety/music)
 Hungary 2001 / Hungary 2002 (Hungarian variety/music)
 inDialog (Hindi variety/music) 
 Inside Britain (English variety/music) 
 Italian Variety (Italian variety/music) 
 Jerusalem OnLine (English variety/music)
 Joyful Gathering (Mandarin variety/music)
 Kev Koom Siab (Hmong variety/music) 
 Khubsoorat (Hindi variety/music)
 Korean Music Countdown (Korean popular music)
 Kung Faux
 Late Night V (Hindi variety/music)
 Mexico de Mis Amores (Spanish variety/music)
 Mix Music Bang (music videos)
 Music Video Heaven (Korean variety/music)
 Pasand Apni Apni (Hindi variety/music)
Pilipinas, Game KNB? (Filipino Game Show)
popjapan.tv (Japanese music videos and interviews from Sony Music Japan artists)
 Punjabi Variety (Other variety/music)
 Rang TV (Punjabi) (other variety/music)
Revolution (Korean and Japanese pop music videos)
 Russian Variety (Russian variety/music)
 Sa Re Ga Ma / Sa Re Ga Ma Pa (Hindi variety/music)
 Search World Best (Korean variety/music)
 Stateside (Tagalog variety/music) 
 Super Gourmet Mission (Mandarin variety/music/other)
 Tanin (Persian variety/music)
 Tea Time (Mandarin variety/music)
 Unsolved Mystery (Korean variety/music)
Victoria to Uyen Show (Vietnamese variety)
What's Up Thailand (Thai music)
 Yeh Hai Mere Apne (Hindi variety/music)
 Zee Premiere Show (Hindi variety/music)

Anime
Anime shows were broadcast in Japanese with English subtitles, or English dub.

Armored Trooper VOTOMS
Bakugan Battle Brawlers
Black Heaven
Black Jack
Darkside Blues
Deltora Quest
Descendants of Darkness
Dragon Ball GT
Dragon Ball Z
El-Hazard: The Magnificent World
El-Hazard: The Alternative World
Fushigi Yugi
Hoshin Engi
Kishin Corps
Kuma no Putaro 
Last Exile
Legend of Himiko 
L/R: Licensed by Royalty  
Lost Universe
Naruto
Patlabor 
Princess Rouge
Project A-ko 
Record of Lodoss War 
Revolutionary Girl Utena  
Roujin Z
Slayers
Slayers Next 
Slayers Try  
Sol Bianca: The Legacy
Sonic X
Space Pirate Mito
Tai Chi Chasers
Tenchi Muyo!
Tenchi in Tokyo 
Tenchi Universe  
The Irresponsible Captain Tylor
Tsukuyomi -Moon Phase- 
 Urusei Yatsura 
World of Narue
Wrath of the Ninja
Yu-Gi-Oh! Duel Monsters
Yu Yu Hakusho: The Movie

Other

Asia's Best Kept Secret (Singaporean, travel)
Asian Excellence Awards (annual)
Asian Wok (Singaporean, cooking)
Basta't Kasama Kita (Filipino Action/Adventure)
 Bayani (Tagalog children's) 
 My Britain (English other)
 Children's Animation (French children's)
 Cross Talk (Mandarin other)
 Game K N B? (Tagalog other)
Gourmet Moments (Singaporean cooking)
Get Drunk In China
 Gilette World Sports (English sports) 
 Groundling Marsh (Spanish children's) 
 India Vision (Hindi other)
 Italian Soccer (Italian sports)
 LiAo Talk Show (Mandarin other)
 Math Tinik (Tagalog children's) 
 The Message (English other) 
NBA Timeout (sports)
Pocoyo (Spanish children's)
 Sineskwela (Tagalog children's)
Stir TV (youth)
Strut (travel)
ToonHeads (Entertainment)
 Unicef (English other)
 Winx Club (Italian children's)
 Wool 100 Percent
 World of Rugby (English sports)

References

External links
Farewell to AZN Television from YouTube

Defunct television networks in the United States
Asian-American television
Comcast
Television channels and stations established in 1990
Television channels and stations disestablished in 2008
Defunct companies based in Pennsylvania